Pirada is a Sector in the Gabú Region of Guinea-Bissau. It is a town and an administrative division (sector) in the northeast area of Guinea-Bissau with an area of 934.4 km² and a population of 2,629. Pirada is near the border between Guinea-Bissau and Senegal and is very sparsely populated with only 35 people per square kilometer.

References

Gabu Region
Sectors of Guinea-Bissau
Populated places in Guinea-Bissau